Joel Fein (June 19, 1944 – September 22, 2007) was an American sound engineer. He was nominated for an Academy Award in the category Best Sound for the film The Buddy Holly Story.

Selected filmography
 The Buddy Holly Story (1978)

References

External links

1944 births
2007 deaths
American audio engineers
People from Philadelphia
Engineers from Pennsylvania
20th-century American engineers